Club Deportivo Arenas de Frajanas is a football team based in El Astillero in the autonomous community of Cantabria. Founded in 1991, the team plays in Tercera División – Group 3. The club's home ground is Municipal de Frajanas, which has a capacity of 1,000 spectators.

Season to season

3 seasons in Tercera División

External links
Futbolme.com profile 

Football clubs in Cantabria
Association football clubs established in 1991
Divisiones Regionales de Fútbol clubs
1991 establishments in Spain
Sports leagues established in 1991